In mathematical physics and differential geometry, a gravitational instanton is a four-dimensional complete Riemannian manifold satisfying the vacuum Einstein equations. They are so named because they are analogues in quantum theories of gravity of instantons in Yang–Mills theory. In accordance with this analogy with self-dual Yang–Mills instantons, gravitational instantons are usually assumed to look like four dimensional Euclidean space at large distances, and to have a self-dual Riemann tensor. Mathematically, this means that they are asymptotically locally Euclidean (or perhaps asymptotically locally flat) hyperkähler 4-manifolds, and in this sense, they are special examples of Einstein manifolds. From a physical point of view, a gravitational instanton is a non-singular solution of the vacuum Einstein equations with positive-definite, as opposed to Lorentzian, metric.

There are many possible generalizations of the original conception of a gravitational instanton: for example one can allow gravitational instantons to have a nonzero cosmological constant or a Riemann tensor which is not self-dual. One can also relax the boundary condition that the metric is asymptotically Euclidean.

There are many methods for constructing gravitational instantons, including the Gibbons–Hawking Ansatz, twistor theory, and the hyperkähler quotient construction.

Introduction 
Gravitational instantons are interesting, as they offer insights into the quantization of gravity. For example, positive definite asymptotically locally Euclidean metrics are needed as they obey the positive-action conjecture; actions that are unbounded below create divergence in the quantum path integral.

 A four-dimensional Kähler–Einstein manifold has a self-dual Riemann tensor.
 Equivalently, a self-dual gravitational instanton is a four-dimensional complete hyperkähler manifold.
 Gravitational instantons are analogous to self-dual Yang–Mills instantons.

Several distinctions can be made with respect to the structure of the Riemann curvature tensor, pertaining to flatness and self-duality. These include:
 Einstein (non-zero cosmological constant)
 Ricci flatness (vanishing Ricci tensor)
 Conformal flatness (vanishing Weyl tensor)
 Self-duality
 Anti-self-duality
 Conformally self-dual
 Conformally anti-self-dual

Taxonomy 
By specifying the 'boundary conditions', i.e. the asymptotics of the metric 'at infinity' on a noncompact Riemannian manifold, gravitational instantons are divided into a few classes, such as asymptotically locally Euclidean spaces (ALE spaces), asymptotically locally flat spaces (ALF spaces).

They can be further characterized by whether the Riemann tensor is self-dual, whether the Weyl tensor is self-dual, or neither; whether or not they are Kahler manifolds; and various characteristic classes, such as Euler characteristic, the Hirzebruch signature (Pontryagin class), the Rarita—Schwinger index (spin-3/2 index), or generally the Chern class. The ability to support a spin structure (i.e. to allow consistent Dirac spinors) is another appealing feature.

List of examples 
Eguchi et al. list a number of examples of gravitational instantons. These include, among others:
 Flat space , the torus  and the Euclidean de Sitter space , i.e. the standard metric on the 4-sphere.
 The product of spheres .
 The Schwarzschild metric  and the Kerr metric 
 The Eguchi–Hanson instanton , given below.
 The Taub–NUT solution, given below.
 The Fubini–Study metric on the complex projective plane  Note that the complex projective plane does not support well-defined Dirac spinors. That is, it is not a spin structure. It can be given a spinc structure, however.
 Page space, a rotating compact metric on the direct sum of two complex projective planes .
 The Gibbons–Hawking multi-center metrics, given below.
 The Taub-bolt metric  and the rotating Taub-bolt metric. The "bolt" metrics have a cylindrical-type coordinate singularity at the origin, as compared to the "nut" metrics, which have a sphere coordinate singularity. In both cases, the coordinate singularity can be removed by switching to Euclidean coordinates at the origin.
 The K3 surfaces.
 The asymptotically locally Euclidean self-dual manifolds, including the lens spaces , the double-coverings of the dihedral groups, the tetrahedral group, the octahedral group, and the icosahedral group. Note that  corresponds to the Eguchi–Hanson instanton, while for higher k, the  corresponds to the Gibbons–Hawking multi-center metrics.
This is an incomplete list; there are others.

Examples 
It will be convenient to write the gravitational instanton solutions below using left-invariant 1-forms on the three-sphere S3 (viewed as the group Sp(1) or SU(2)).  These can be defined in terms of Euler angles by

Note that  for  cyclic.

Taub–NUT metric

Eguchi–Hanson metric 
The Eguchi–Hanson space is defined by a metric the cotangent bundle of the 2-sphere . This metric is

where .

Asymptotically (i.e., in the limit ) the metric looks like

which naively seems as the flat metric on R4. Thus the metric is asymptotically R4 with the identification , which is a Z2 subgroup of SO(4), the rotation group of R4. Therefore, the metric is said to be asymptotically 
R4/Z2.

There is a transformation to another coordinate system, in which the metric looks like

where

In the new coordinates,  has the usual periodicity 

One may replace V by 

For some n points , i = 1, 2..., n.
This gives a multi-center Eguchi–Hanson gravitational instanton, which is again smooth everywhere if the angular coordinates have the usual periodicities (to avoid conical singularities).

In other words, it is R4 identified under , or, equivalently, C2 identified under zi ~  zi for i = 1, 2.

To conclude, the multi-center Eguchi–Hanson geometry is a Kähler Ricci flat geometry which is asymptotically C2/Zn. According to Yau's theorem this is the only geometry satisfying these properties. Therefore, this is also the geometry of a C2/Zn orbifold in string theory after its conical singularity has been smoothed away by its "blow up" (i.e., deformation).

Gibbons–Hawking multi-centre metrics 
The Gibbons–Hawking multi-center metrics are given by

where

FLRW-metrics as gravitational instantons 

In 2021 it was found  that if one views the curvature parameter of a foliated maximally symmetric space as a continues function, the gravitational action, as a sum of the Einstein–Hilbert action and the Gibbons–Hawking–York boundary term, becomes that of a point particle. Then the trajectory is the scale factor and the curvature parameter is viewed as the potential. For the solutions restricted like this general relativity takes the form of a topological Yang–Mills theory.

See also 

 Gravitational anomaly
 Hyperkähler manifold

References 

Riemannian manifolds
Quantum gravity
Mathematical physics
4-manifolds